Ubiquitin-conjugating enzyme E2 K is a protein that in humans is encoded by the UBE2K gene.

The protein encoded by this gene belongs to the ubiquitin-conjugating enzyme family. It binds selectively to a large region at the N terminus of huntingtin. This interaction is not influenced by the length of the huntingtin polyglutamine tract. This protein has been implicated in the degradation of huntingtin and suppression of apoptosis.

Interactions 

HIP2 has been shown to interact with Huntingtin and RNF2.

References

Further reading